According to the tradition of the Physiologus and medieval bestiaries, the aspidochelone is a fabled sea creature, variously described as a large whale or vast sea turtle, and a giant sea monster with huge spines on the ridge of its back. No matter what form it is, it is always described as being so huge that it is often mistaken for an island and appears to be rocky with crevices and valleys with trees and greenery and having sand dunes all over it. The name aspidochelone appears to be a compound word combining Greek aspis (which means either "asp" or "shield"), and chelone, the turtle. It rises to the surface from the depths of the sea, and entices unwitting sailors with its island appearance to make landfall on its huge shell and then the whale is able to pull them under the ocean, ship and all the people, drowning them. It also emits a sweet smell that lures fish into its trap where it then devours them. In the moralistic allegory of the Physiologus and bestiary tradition, the aspidochelone represents Satan, who deceives those whom he seeks to devour.

Origins

The oldest version of the Aspidochelone legend is found in the Physiologus (2nd century AD) :

There is a monster in the sea which in Greek is called aspidochelone, in Latin "asp-turtle"; it is a great whale, that has what appear to be beaches on its hide, like those from the sea-shore. This creature raises its back above the waves of the sea, so that sailors believe that it is just an island, so that when they see it, it appears to them to be a sandy beach such as is common along the sea-shore. Believing it to be an island, they beach their ship alongside it, and disembarking, they plant stakes and tie up the ships. Then, in order to cook a meal after this work, they make fires on the sand as if on land. But when the monster feels the heat of these fires, it immediately submerges into the water, and pulls the ship into the depths of the sea.

The Alexander Romance includes the story of a "monster" confused as an island in the Alexander's letter to Aristotle:"After they landed on the so-called island and an hour passed, suddenly it proved to be no island, but a monster which plunged into the sea. We shouted and it disappeared, but some of my companions met a wretched death, among them my best friend." Another sea monster, which attacks Alexander and his companions, is identified as "a lobster" in the Armenian version of the Alexander Romance, or "beasts that are called crabs" by Leo Archpriest.

In the Babylonian Talmud (Baba Batra 73a), Rabbah bar bar Hana states: Once we were traveling on a ship and we saw a certain fish upon which sand had settled, and grass grew on it. We assumed that it was dry land and went up and baked and cooked on the back of the fish, but when its back grew hot it turned over. And were it not for the fact that the ship was close by, we would have drowned. This monster is called Qorha in a poem by Jewish scholar Samuel ibn Naghrillah

The Whale

Sea monsters so great as islands appears in biblical comentaries. Basil of Caesarea in his Hexameron says the following about the "great whales" (hebrew tannin) mentioned in the fifth day of creation (Genesis 1:21):

Scripture gives them the name of great not because they are greater than a shrimp and a sprat, but because the size of their bodies equals that of great hills. Thus when they swim on the surface of the waters one often sees them appear like islands. But these monstrous creatures do not frequent our coasts and shores; they inhabit the Atlantic ocean. Such are these animals created to strike us with terror and awe. If now you hear say that the greatest vessels, sailing with full sails, are easily stopped by a very small fish, by the remora, and so forcibly that the ship remains motionless for a long time, as if it had taken root in the middle of the sea, do you not see in this little creature a like proof of the power of the Creator?

The Pseudo-Eustatius Commentary on the Hexameron connects this passage with Aspidochelone mentioned in the Physiologus.

A related story is the Jonah's Whale legend. Pliny the Elder's Natural History tells the story of a giant fish, which he names pristis, of immense size.

The Lucian's True History contains elements of both Jonah's Whale and Aspidochelone legends.

The allegory of the Aspidochelone borrows from the account of whales in Saint Isidore of Seville's Etymologiae. Isidore cites the prophet Jonah; the Vulgate translation of the Book of Jonah translates Jonah 2:2 as Exaudivit me de ventre inferni: "He (the Lord) heard me from the belly of Hell". He concludes that such whales must have bodies as large as mountains.

Zaratan

The Arabic polymath Al-Jahiz mentions three monsters the are supposed live in the sea: the tanin (sea-dragon), the saratan (crab) and the bala (whale). About the second (saratan), he said the following:

As to the sarathan, I have never yet met anybody who could assure me he had seen it with his own eyes. Of course, if we were to believe all that sailors tell [. . .]for they claim that on occasions they have landed on certain islands having woods and valleys and fissures and have lit a great fire ; and when the monster felt the fire on its back, it began to glide away with them and all the plants growing on it, so that only such as managed to flee were saved. This tale outdoes the most fabulous and preposterous of stories.

This monster is mentioned in The Wonders of Creation, written by Al Qazwini, and in the first voyage of Sinbad the Sailor in The Book of One Thousand and One Nights.

Jasconius

A similar monster appears in the Legend of Saint Brendan, where it was called Jasconius. Because of its size, Brendan and his fellow voyagers mistake it for an island and land to make camp. They celebrate Easter on the sleeping giant's back, but awaken it when they light their campfire. They race to their ship, and Brendan explains that the moving island is really Jasconius, who labors unsuccessfully to put his tail in its mouth.

Fastitocalon

A similar tale is told by the Old English poem "The Whale", where the monster appears under the name Fastitocalon.  The poem has an unknown author, and is one of three poems in the Old English Physiologus, also known as the Bestiary, in the Exeter Book, folio 96b-97b, that are allegorical in nature, the other two being "The Panther" and "The Partridge". The Exeter book is now in the Exeter Cathedral library. The book has suffered from multiple mutilations and it is possible that some of the manuscript is missing. It is believed that the book had been used as a “beer mat”, a cutting board, and suffered other types of mutilation by its previous owners. The Physiologus has gone through many different translations into many different languages throughout the world. It is possible that the content has also been changed throughout the centuries.

"This time I will with poetic art rehearse, by means of words and wit, a poem about a kind of fish, the great sea-monster which is often unwillingly met, terrible and cruel-hearted to seafarers, yea, to every man; this swimmer of the ocean-streams is known as the asp-turtle.

His appearance is like that of a rough boulder, as if there were tossing by the shore a great ocean-reedbank begirt with sand-dunes, so that seamen imagine they are gazing upon an island, and moor their high-prowed ships with cables to that false land, make fast the ocean-coursers at the sea's end, and, bold of heart, climb up."

The moral of the story remains the same:

"Such is the way of demons, the wont of devils: they spend their lives in outwitting men by their secret power, inciting them to the corruption of good deeds, misguiding."

In The Adventures of Tom Bombadil, J. R. R. Tolkien made a little verse that claimed the name "Fastitocalon" from The Whale, and told a similar story:

Look, there is Fastitocalon!An island good to land upon,Although 'tis rather bare.Come, leave the sea! And let us run,Or dance, or lie down in the sun!See, gulls are sitting there!Beware!

As such, Tolkien imported the traditional tale of the aspidochelone into the lore of his Middle-earth.

Other sources

In the Icelandic Sagas, Aspidochelone is known by the names Hafgufa and Lyngbakr.

In the folklore of the Inuit of Greenland, there was a similar monster called an Imap Umassoursa. It was a giant sea monster that often was mistaken for a vast and flat island. When the monster emerged from the water, it would tip sailors into freezing waters, causing their deaths. Whenever the waters seemed shallow, the sailors would tread carefully for fear of being over that dreadful creature.

In Chile, there is a giant sea monster named Cuero, or Hide. It is a vast and flat thing that looks like stretched out animal hide that devours every living thing that it comes in contact with. It is also known to lure sailors to their death.

Appearances in modern fiction
 Accounts of seafarers' encounters with gigantic fish appear in various other works including The Adventures of Pinocchio. In the 2022 stop-motion adaptation by Guillermo del Toro, the Terrible Dogfish directly references the Aspidochelone by having the part of its body that sticks out of the water being mistaken for an island while it sleeps.
 Both The Adventures of Baron Munchausen and Sinbad: Legend of the Seven Seas have the heroes coming across an island that reveals to be a huge sea monster resembling an anglerfish.
 In Tolkien's poem Fastitocalon, the title is the name of an immense turtle (in the initial version a whale) which awaits victims to settle upon its shell, before plunging to the depths.
 In The NeverEnding Story, the giant turtle Morla is an Island Turtle that lives in the Swamp of Sadness.
 In Stephen King's The Dark Tower, Jasconius is the name of the Fish guardian, one of the twelve who guard the beams that support the Tower.
 The name Jasconius is used for the whale in the children's book The Adventures of Louey and Frank by Carolyn White. She attributes the name to having grown up with the legend of Brendan.
 The popular Magic: The Gathering card game also features a card named Island Fish Jasconius, the art of which is a massive fish bearing tropical foliage on its back.
 The Pokémon, Torterra, is based on the island turtle.
 The film Aladdin and the King of Thieves featured the Vanishing Isle that is a giant marble fortress on the back of a giant sea turtle that periodically rises from the ocean and goes back underwater. This is where the Hand of Midas was located.
 In the video game The Legend of Zelda: Majora's Mask, the player Link rides to the Great Bay Temple on the back of a giant sea turtle that resembles a small island.
 In the (MMORPG) Final Fantasy XI, Aspidochelone is a rare spawn of the monster Adamantoise both of which are giant turtles.
 The Digimon franchise had their own versions of the Aspidochelone in the form of Ebonwumon (a two-headed turtle Digimon Sovereign with a tree on its back), ElDradimon (who has a city on its back), and KingWhamon (who bares the Island Zone on the top of its head).
 In Yu-Gi-Oh!, the Island Turtle is a water creature.
 The asp-turtle make an appearance in Naruto, where Naruto Uzumaki goes to train before a big battle. This version of the asp-turtle is a little different. It does not lure the travelers to their death. It works with them so they are not discovered. It also floats in the sea and is constantly moving. However, it is a giant turtle with the appearance of an island. Killer B has a house on the Island Turtle and there are apes living there.
 The series Avatar: The Last Airbender and its sequel series The Legend of Korra featured similar creatures called Lion-Turtles, which were lion-turtle chimeras so large they carried entire ecosystems and even cities on their shells.
 In the One Piece film The Giant Mechanical Soldier of Karakuri Castle, Mecha Island is a type of Island Turtle that awakens every thousand years to lay its eggs.
 The multiplayer online role-playing game (MMORPG) World of Warcraft'''s fourth expansion pack Mists of Pandaria introduced a new zone The Wandering Isle, set on the back of a roaming giant turtle named Shen-zin Su, where pandaren player characters begin their adventure. The turtle's origins lie with the pandaren explorer Lui Lang, who was overcome with wanderlust, a rare trait in the pandaren of that time. Because of this he departed the pandaren continent of Pandaria around 10,000 years ago, riding on the back of the then man-sized turtle, Shen-zin Su. Lui Lang later returned to his homeland a few times, and each time the turtle had become progressively bigger. By the time players encounter Shen-zin Su, the turtle has grown to the size of a small continent, complete with fertile farmlands, mountains, lakes and a thriving population of pandaren, animals and plant life. In addition to serving as a home and method of transportation for his inhabitants, Shen-zin Su is a fully sapient being and quite aware of the Wandering Isle pandaren that have been living on his back for generations.
 The official lyric video for From Finner by Of Monsters and Men depicts a large whale-like creature swimming with a city on its back, with the lyrics hinting that the titular "Finner" could be the creature itself.
 In Dragalia Lost, it is the raid boss of the "Scars of the Syndicate" event.

See also
 Kraken
 Vanishing island
 World Turtle

References

External links
 The Old English poem "The Whale" is edited, annotated and linked to digital images of its manuscript pages, and translated, in the Old English Poetry in Facsimile Project'': https://oepoetryfacsimile.org/
"The Devil in the Deep Blue Sea", by Hannah Stewart, Getty Museum. In the medieval bestiary, whales are a surprising symbol for the temptations of the devil.
The Whale modern English translation

Medieval European legendary creatures
Legendary fish
Legendary turtles
Fictional whales
Sea monsters